Thomas (the Tank Engine) & Friends is a children's television series about the engines and other characters working on the railways of the Island of Sodor, and is based on The Railway Series books written by the Reverend W. Awdry.

This article lists and details episodes from the seventeenth series of the show, which was first broadcast from 2013 to 2014.

Production

During production of the sixteenth series, Sharon Miller stepped down as head writer, and Andrew Brenner, formerly head writer for Fireman Sam, was appointed as her successor. Brenner already had a previous history with the brand, having adapted the first two series and subsequently written several original stories for the Thomas the Tank Engine & Friends magazine, published by Marvel Comics from 1987 until the early 1990s. Many of his stories were later adapted by Britt Allcroft and David Mitton for the third series (plus a further one for the fifth) without his knowledge or consent.

This also marked the first series since the fifth to include a railway consultant as part of the production team, with Sam Wilkinson in the role.

This series was narrated by Mark Moraghan for audiences in the United Kingdom and United States; this was his first series as narrator.

The CGI animation for this series was provided by Arc Productions, who took over from Nitrogen Studios following completion of Series 16 and Blue Mountain Mystery in 2012.

In April 2013, Lionsgate released the DVD "Railway Mischief", which featured five episodes from the new series (episodes 4, 1, 2, 3 & 6) months before they were broadcast on television. The DVD was available exclusively at Walmart.

Episodes

Voice cast

David Menkin and Jonathan Broadbent joins the cast along with Bob Golding, Jonathan Forbes, Rebeca O'Mara, Miranda Raison and Mike Grady from that year's special.

Following the number of departures for the previous year, Martin Sherman took over role of Diesel in the US, Keith Wickham took over the role of Bertie, Ben Small took over the role of Flynn, Steven Kynman took over the role of Butch in the US and Dart, and Teresa Gallagher takes over the role of Mavis in the US while David Bedella officially takes over the role of Victor in the UK.

Notes

References

2013 British television seasons
2014 British television seasons
Thomas & Friends seasons